Aleksej Pokuševski (born 26 December 2001) is a Serbian professional basketball player for the Oklahoma City Thunder of the National Basketball Association (NBA).

Born in Belgrade, Pokuševski was previously a youth player for the Greek club, Olympiacos. He debuted for their senior team in 2018, at age 17 and becoming the youngest EuroLeague player in club history. He was selected by the Minnesota Timberwolves with the 17th overall pick in the 2020 NBA draft and traded to the Thunder.

Early career
Pokuševski grew up in Novi Sad, where he started to play youth basketball for local clubs, KK Kadet, KK NS Stars, and Vojvodina. In 2015, Pokuševski joined the youth system of Olympiacos. In 2017, he participated in the Jordan Brand Classic camp. In August 2018, he attended the Basketball Without Borders Europe camp, in Belgrade, Serbia. In February 2019, Pokuševski was invited for the NBA All-Star Basketball Without Borders Global Camp in Charlotte, North Carolina, but eventually missed the event after being rejected for a U.S. visa.

Professional career

Olympiacos (2019–2020)
On 19 March 2019, Pokuševski made his EuroLeague debut with Olympiacos, in a 89–69 win over the German club Bayern Munich, during the EuroLeague's 2018–19 season. He recorded 1 point, 2 rebounds and 1 assist, in one minute played during the game. Pokuševski became the youngest senior men's Olympiacos player to ever debut in the EuroLeague. At 17 years and 83 days old, he replaced Georgios Printezis, who had previously debuted in the EuroLeague, at the age of 17 years and 229 days, as the club's youngest ever EuroLeague player.

For the 2019–20 season, Pokuševski was assigned to play in the Greek A2 League, the country's second-tier league, with Olympiacos' reserve team, Olympiacos B. He initially played for the senior EuroLeague club's practice squad. During the season, Pokuševski missed almost 3 months of playing time, due to a knee injury.

Pokuševski started in eight of his 11 appearances in the Greek A2, averaging 10.8 points, 7.9 rebounds, 3.1 assists, 1.3 steals, and 1.8 blocks in 23.1 minutes per game. He shot 40.4 percent from the field, 32.1 percent from 3-point range, and 78.3 percent from the free-throw line. In the middle of the season, Olympiacos' main EuroLeague team was riddled with injuries, and Pokuševski was called up to the senior team. He played two minutes in his only EuroLeague game of the season, before the league's season was suspended due to the COVID-19 pandemic in Europe.

On 24 April 2020, Pokuševski declared for the 2020 NBA draft. Pokuševski's Olympiacos contract lasts through the end of the 2023–24 season. The contract's buyout clause for the NBA is €1 million, if he is a top 20 draft pick, or €1.5 million, if he is a top 14 lottery pick. Following selection in the NBA draft, Pokuševski left Olympiacos on 24 November 2020.

Oklahoma City Thunder (2020–present)
Pokuševski was selected with the 17th overall pick in the 2020 NBA draft by the Minnesota Timberwolves, becoming the youngest player selected in the draft. Two days after the draft in November 2020, his draft rights were traded to the Oklahoma City Thunder in a three-team trade. On December 9th 2020, Pokuševski signed with the Thunder. On 3 February 2021, Pokuševski received his first assignment at Oklahoma City Blue, the affiliate team of Oklahoma City Thunder in the NBA G League. In his rookie season, he was the youngest active player in the NBA. On 14 March, Pokuševski made his first NBA career start. He scored 23 points which includes five 3-pointers, grabbed a career-high 10 rebounds and dished out 4 assists in a 128–122 win over the Memphis Grizzlies, becoming the third Thunder rookie (following Russell Westbrook and Darius Bazley) to post a 20–10 double-double. At 19 years and 78 days old, he became the youngest player in franchise history to score 20+ points while also setting the record for being the youngest player in league history with 20+ points, 10+ rebounds and 5+ 3-pointers made in a game. Pokuševski also became the second-youngest player in NBA history to make five 3-pointers in a game behind only LeBron James in 2004.

On April 3, 2022, Pokuševski recorded his first NBA triple-double with 17 points, 10 rebounds, and 12 assists in a 117–96 win over the Phoenix Suns, becoming the seventh Thunder and the 12th youngest player in NBA history (after Magic Johnson) to achieve a triple-double. 

In July 2022, Pokuševski joined the Thunder for the 2022 NBA Summer League.

National team career
Pokuševski was a member of the Serbian national under-17 team that competed at the 2018 FIBA Under-17 World Cup, in Argentina. Over seven tournament games, he averaged 7.7 points, 8.3 rebounds, 1.6 assists, and 3.0 blocks per game.

Pokuševski was a member of the Serbian national under-18 team that competed at the 2019 FIBA Under-18 European Championship, in Volos, Greece. Over seven tournament games, he averaged 10.0 points, 7.2 rebounds, 3.7 assists, 2.7 steals, and 4.0 blocks per game.

Initially at the preliminary Serbia roster for EuroBasket 2022, Pokuševski was cut from the squad due to disapproval of the Thunder.

Career statistics

NBA

Regular season

|-
| style="text-align:left;"|
| style="text-align:left;"|Oklahoma City
| 45 || 28 || 24.2 || .341 || .280 || .738 || 4.7 || 2.2 || .4 || .9 || 8.2
|-
| style="text-align:left;"|
| style="text-align:left;"|Oklahoma City
| 61 || 12 || 20.2 || .408 || .289 || .700 || 5.2 || 2.1 || .6 || .6 || 7.6
|- class="sortbottom"
| style="text-align:center;" colspan="2"|Career
| 106 || 40 || 21.9 || .376 || .285 || .717 || 5.0 || 2.2 || .6 || .8 || 7.8

EuroLeague

|-
| style="text-align=left;"|2018–19
| style="text-align-left;" rowspan="2"|Olympiacos
| 2 || 0 || 2.9 || .000 || .000 || .500 || 1.0 || .5 || .5 || .0 || .5 || .0
|-
| style="text-align=left;"| 2019–20
| 1 || 0 || 2 || .000 ||  || || .0 || .0 || .0 || .0 || .0 || -2.0
|- class="sortbottom"
| style="text-align:center;" colspan="2"| Career
| 3 || 0 || 2.7 || .000 || .000 || .500 || .7 || .3 || .3 || .0 || .3 || -0.7

Personal life
Pokuševski's family originates from Pristina. Due to the Kosovo War in 1999, his family escaped to Podgorica (nowadays in Montenegro), and moved to Belgrade, Serbia, afterwards, where Pokuševski was born in 2001. Thereafter, Pokuševski and his family permanently moved to Novi Sad. Pokuševki family hails from Galicia, present day Ukraine.

After signing a youth team contract with the Greek basketball club Olympiacos, Pokuševski moved to Greece in 2015, at the age of 13. While playing in Greek competitions, he counts as a native Greek domestic player, since he started competing in Greek competitions before the age of 14. He was eligible to represent either Serbia or Greece in national team competitions, and he chose to represent Serbia. His father Saša Pokuševski, is a former professional basketball player and a coach. His father played basketball with KK Priština, and coached KK Novi Sad.

Pokuševski is a fan of Partizan.

See also
 List of Serbian NBA players

References

External links

 Aleksej Pokusevski at 2020 NBA draft prospects
 Aleksej Pokuševski at eurobasket.com
 Aleksej Pokuševski at euroleague.net
 Aleksej Pokuševski at eurospects.com

2001 births
Living people
Basketball players from Belgrade
Kosovo Serbs
Minnesota Timberwolves draft picks
National Basketball Association players from Serbia
Oklahoma City Blue players
Oklahoma City Thunder players
Olympiacos B.C. B players
Olympiacos B.C. players
Power forwards (basketball)
Serbian expatriate basketball people in Greece
Serbian expatriate basketball people in the United States
Serbian men's basketball players
Serbian people of Ukrainian descent
Small forwards